Angelina may refer to:

Human names
Angelina (given name), a feminine given name
The feminine form of the family name Angelos

People

Entertainers
Angelina (American singer), American retired singer Angelina Camarillo Ramos (born 1976)
Angelina (French singer)
Angelina Love, ring name of Canadian professional wrestler Lauren Williams (born 1981)
Eva Angelina (born 1985), American porn actress

Other people
Angelina (footballer) (born 2000), Brazilian professional footballer
Anna Komnene Angelina ( 1176–1212), Empress of Nicaea, daughter of Byzantine Emperor Alexios III Angelos and Euphrosyne Doukaina Kamatera
Irene Angelina (died 1208), daughter of Byzantine Emperor Isaac II Angelos and Herina
Eudokia Angelina (died  1211), consort of Stefan the First-Crowned, Grand Prince of Serbia, and daughter of Byzantine Emperor Alexios III Angelos and Euphrosyne Doukaina Kamaterina
Theodora Angelina (daughter of Isaac Komnenos) (late 12th and early 13th century), daughter of Anna Komnene Angelina and Isaac Komnenos
Theodora Angelina (died 1246)

Places

Buildings and facilities
Angelina (tea house), a café in Paris, France
Angelina College, a community college in Lufkin, Texas, US
Angelina County Airport, near Lufkin, Texas
Angelina Field, an airport in Cotuí, Dominican Republic

Other places
Angelina, Santa Catarina, Brazil, a municipality
Angelina County, Texas, US
Angelina National Forest, US
Angelina River, Texas, US
64 Angelina, an asteroid

Science
Angelina (fungus), a genus of fungi in the family Dermateaceae
Angelina (trilobite), a genus of extinct arthropods from the early Silurian
64 Angelina, an asteroid

Songs
"Angelina" (Bob Dylan song), 1981
"Angelina" (PSY song), 1991
"Angelina", from the album Ladies and Gentlemen by Lou Bega
"Angelina", from the album The Sun and the Moon by The Bravery
"Angelina", from the album Earl Klugh by Earl Klugh
"Angelina", from the album On the Double by Golden Earring
"Angelina", from the album Jump Up Calypso by Harry Belafonte
"Angelina", from the album Marbles by Marillion
"Angelina", from the album Play It Loud by Slade

Other uses
Angelina, the principal character in the opera La Cenerentola by Rossini, equivalent to Cinderella

See also

Angel (disambiguation)
Angela (disambiguation)
Angeleno, a term for residents of Los Angeles, California
Angelia
Angeline (disambiguation)
Angelini (surname)
Angelino (disambiguation)
Angelyne (disambiguation)